Pascal Bader (born 24 September 1982) is a Swiss former professional footballer who works as a coach.

Career
In 2017 Bader became player-coach of FC Hochdorf.

References

External links
 
 football.ch

1982 births
Living people
Swiss men's footballers
Footballers from Zürich
Association football central defenders
Association football midfielders
Swiss Super League players
Swiss Challenge League players
3. Liga players
FC Solothurn players
FC Baden players
FC Luzern players
VfR Aalen players
FC Vaduz players
FC Hochdorf players
Swiss expatriate footballers
Swiss expatriate sportspeople in Liechtenstein
Expatriate footballers in Liechtenstein